Sakmar (Haqmar) is a rural locality (a village) in Temyasovsky Selsoviet, Baymaksky District, Bashkortostan, Russia. The population was 472 as of 2010. There are 7 streets.

Geography 
Sakmar is located 34 km north of Baymak (the district's administrative centre) by road. Nigamatovo is the nearest rural locality.

References 

Rural localities in Baymaksky District